Victor Manuel Arboleda Murillo (born 1 January 1997) is a Colombian footballer who plays for Unión Magdalena.

Career
Arboleda joined United Soccer League side Portland Timbers 2 on 24 March 2016. He was selected in the USL's 20 under 20, highlighting the league's 20 best players under 20 years old. He made the move to the Timber's senior team on January 12, 2017. Arboleda was released by Portland on 10 December 2018.

In July 2019, Arboleda joined Alianza Petrolera. In January 2020, Arboleda joined Unión Magdalena.

References

External links
Timbers 2 Profile

1997 births
Living people
Association football forwards
Colombian footballers
Colombian expatriate footballers
Deportivo Cali footballers
Portland Timbers 2 players
Portland Timbers players
Alianza Petrolera players
Categoría Primera A players
USL Championship players
Major League Soccer players
Colombian expatriate sportspeople in the United States
Expatriate soccer players in the United States
Sportspeople from Valle del Cauca Department